A sharashka (sometimes sharaga, sharazhka, also known as , ОКБ) were secret research and development laboratories operating from 1930 to the 1950s within the Soviet Gulag labor-camp system. Etymologically, the word sharashka derives from a Russian slang expression sharashkina kontora, ("Sharashka's office"), which in its turn comes from the criminal argot term sharaga (шарага) for a band of thieves, hoodlums, etc.) an ironic, derogatory term to denote a poorly-organized, impromptu, or bluffing organization.

The scientists and engineers at a sharashka were prisoners picked by the Soviet government from various camps and prisons and assigned to work on scientific and technological problems for the state. Living conditions were usually much better than in an average taiga camp, mostly because of the absence of hard labor.

The results of the research in sharashkas were usually published under the names of prominent Soviet scientists without credit given to the real researchers, whose names frequently have been forgotten. Some of the scientists and engineers imprisoned in sharashkas were released during and after World War II (1939-1945) to continue independent careers; some became world-renowned.

History 
In 1930 Leonid Ramzin and other engineers sentenced in the Industrial Party Trial were formed into a special design bureau under the Joint State Political Directorate (OGPU), which was then the Soviet secret police.

In July 1931, the OGPU seized control of the Convent of the Intercession in Suzdal and then, the following year, created a special prison laboratory (known as the Bureau of Special Purpose or BON) where around nineteen leading plague and tularaemia specialists were forced to work on the development of biological weapons. Colonel Mikhail Mikhailovich Faibich, a specialist in typhus, was the first director of BON. The laboratory was in operation until 1936, when the scientists were transferred to a Red Army microbiology facility on Gorodomlya Island on Lake Seliger.

In 1938, Lavrenty Beria, a senior NKVD official, created the Department of Special Design Bureaus at the NKVD USSR (Отдел особых конструкторских бюро НКВД СССР). In 1939, the unit was renamed the Special Technical Bureau at the NKVD USSR (Особое техническое бюро НКВД СССР) and placed under the leadership of General Valentin Kravchenko, under Beria's immediate supervision. In 1941 it received a secret name, the 4th Special Department of the NKVD USSR (4-й спецотдел НКВД СССР).

In 1949, the scope of the sharashkas significantly increased. Previously the work done there was of military and defense character. The MVD Order No. 001020 dated November 9, 1949 decreed installation of "Special technical and design bureaus" for a wide variety of "civilian" research and development, particularly in the "remote areas of the Union".

The 4th Special Department was disbanded in 1953 when, shortly after Stalin's death, Nikita Khrushchev and other members of the Politburo had Beria arrested and executed.

Notable sharashka inmates 

Aleksandr Solzhenitsyn, a writer. His novel In the First Circle is a vivid account of life in sharashka Marfino.
Lev Kopelev, a writer, another inmate of Marfino (a prototype for Rubin from In the First Circle)
Sergei Korolev, an aircraft and rocket designer, later the chief designer for the Soviet space program.
Valentin Glushko, a chief rocket engine designer. (His biography at MN) 
Andrei Tupolev, the chief designer of the aircraft families Tu and ANT.
Vladimir Petlyakov, the chief designer of the aircraft families Pe and VI (The Petlyakov aircraft).
Vladimir Myasishchev, an aircraft designer.
Leonid Kerber, an aircraft radio equipment designer.
Robert Ludvigovich Bartini (or Roberto Oros di Bartini) an aircraft designer and scientist.
Helmut Gröttrup, a German rocket scientist from the Peenemünde laboratory. (Its head Wernher von Braun was acquired by the US).
Nikolai Nikolaevich Polikarpov, an aircraft designer (arrested for a brief period).
Léon Theremin, a pioneer of electronic music, the inventor of the theremin and a passive eavesdropping device.
Nikolay Timofeev-Ressovsky, a geneticist and radiobiologist (His biography at genetics.org).
Leonid Ramzin, the inventor of the straight-flow boiler ( His biography in Russian).
Yuri Kondratyuk, a pioneer of astronautics and spaceflight, the inventor of the gravitational slingshot.
Sergei Mikhailovich Nikanorov, a leading specialist on Yersinia pestis (the causative agent of plague).
Sergei Vasil'vich Suvorov, a leading specialist on Yersinia pestis (the causative agent of plague).
Boris Yakovlevich El'bert, a leading specialist on Francisella tularensis (the causative agent of tularaemia).
Nikolai Akimovich Gaiskii, a leading specialist on Francisella tularensis (the causative agent of tularaemia).

References

 L.L.Kerber, Von Hardesty, Paul Mitchell, Stalin's Aviation Gulag: Memoir of Andrei Tupolev and the Purge Era (Smithsonian History of Aviation & Spaceflight S.), Smithsonian Institution Press, (hardcover, 1996, 396p.), .

External links

The database of research and design establishments of the Soviet defence industry, 1927–67 by Keith Dexter, The U. of Warwick.

Gulag industry
Political repression in the Soviet Union
Soviet phraseology